Fatoş Gürkan (born 1 January 1966) is a Turkish lawyer and politician with the ruling AKP Party, Member of Parliament.

She was born in Çevlik, Adana. She graduated from Ankara University Law Faculty and worked as a freelance lawyer. She became member of TEMA foundation, Turkish Law Institute. She worked at Adana Bar Association's Child Commission and Culture and Tourism Commission. She is elected representative for Adana in the 23rd Turkish Parliament and is member of  Constitution Commission Secretariat.

References/External links  

Ankara University alumni
Living people
People from Adana
Turkish women lawyers
Justice and Development Party (Turkey) politicians
1966 births
Members of the 24th Parliament of Turkey
Members of the 23rd Parliament of Turkey
Deputies of Adana
21st-century Turkish women politicians
21st-century Turkish politicians
20th-century Turkish lawyers
21st-century Turkish lawyers